The Formula Renault AsiaCup (formerly known as the Asian Formula Renault Challenge and AFR Series) is a Formula Renault 2.0 championship held in Asia. The series debuted in 2002 and also held the China Formula Renault Challenge.

The series is a part of the Formula Racing Development Limited (FRD) organization managed by Kenneth Ma to promote motorsport in Asia. The FRD also runs the China Formula Campus and Clio Cup China Series.

The cars use Tatuus chassis and 2.0 L Renault Clio engines like other Formula Renault 2.0 series. After several seasons racing on Kumho tires, the series started using Giti tires from 2014.

About
With the aim of providing a budget junior racing series around the Asian region, FRD, with the support of Renault Sport, imported a fleet of Formula Renault 2.0 race cars and first organized the Asian Formula Renault Series in 2000. The series attracted numerous young talents from the region.

From 2002 to 2005, the series held an invitational race during the Macau Grand Prix weekend. Future F1 drivers such as Kamui Kobayashi, Kazuki Nakajima, Bruno Senna and Red Bull Junior Team's Scott Speed all once took part in the event.

The Asian Formula Renault Series changed its name to the Formula Renault AsiaCup, commencing in 2020. Formula Renault AsiaCup aligned with the Formula Renault Eurocup running the Tatuus F3R-Spec car with a Renault engine (Formula Renault FR-19) and the FIA F3/2018 homologated chassis.

Regulation
The main classification was the International Challenge, the winner of which was the overall champion of the series. From 2007 until 2013, Asian drivers also had a parallel category with the Asian Challenge. Another class, for Chinese events only, was the China Formula Renault Challenge, which was an entry-level series intended to reduce the championship cost. All series drivers and teams raced at the same time during the races in China but points were calculated separately.

The cars can be tested outside the race weekend on the Zhuhai International Circuit or Shanghai International Circuit.

The race weekend starts on Thursday and Friday with a 2-hour free practice session but with additional cost for drivers. On Saturday there are two 30 minute practice sessions and 20 minutes of qualifications. A warm-up (15 minutes) occurs on Sunday morning and two 10 lap races are held in the afternoon.

In 2013, the series changed its championship format to 3 classes, "International Class" as the main championship, "Asian Class" for rookie drivers of the region and "Masters Class" for gentlemen drivers who are at the age of 35 or older. The 3 classes have their own drivers' and teams' classifications and championship.

In 2015, the series changed its championship format again due to the introduction of the current FR2.0 car, which debuted in 2013 in the European series. Starting from this season, there are two classes, Class A for drivers and teams competing with the 2013 FR2.0 car, and Class B for drivers and teams using the FR2.0 old spec cars.

Only drivers and teams that complete 75% of a race receive points. Points are awarded in each race as follows:

Champions

Series Winners

Macau Asian Formula Renault Challenge Winners

References

External links

Asian Formula Renault Series at frdsports.com.
China Formula Renault Challenge at frdsports.com.
Formula Racing Development Limited official site.

Formula Renault 2.0 series
Auto racing series in China